The Journal for the Study of Antisemitism is a biannual peer-reviewed academic journal published in the United States which covers anthropological, sociological, psychological, legal, historical, philosophical, and political aspects of contemporary antisemitism.

History and format 
The journal was established in 2009. Its founding editors were Steven K. Baum and Neal E. Rosenberg. An issue of the journal typically features five or six major articles, several essays and reviews.

Controversy 
The inaugural issue of the journal edited by Michael Berenbaum was mired in politics when an article critical of the Berlin Centre for Antisemitism Research led to the temporary dismissal of editorial board member Clemens Heni. Several other board members resigned, but returned when Heni was reinstated.

References

External links 
 

Opposition to antisemitism in the United States
Biannual journals
Publications established in 2009
English-language journals
Political science journals